The list of Russian nationals named in the CAATSA unclassified report, also known as the CAATSA Report or "Putin list", was a list published by the U.S. Treasury Department in 2018. It contained the names of 210 prominent Russians, including members of the government of Russian president Vladimir Putin and alleged Russian oligarchs.

Background 
Section 241 of the Countering America's Adversaries Through Sanctions Act of 2017 (СААTSA) required the Secretary of the Treasury, in consultation with the Director of National Intelligence and the Secretary of State, to submit to the appropriate congressional committees a detailed report оп senior political figures and oligarchs in the Russian Federation (Section 241 (a)(1)) and on Russian parastatal entities (Section 241 (а)(2)).

Although it was widely, and incorrectly, reported in the media that those on the list "may be subject to sanctions", the CAATSA Report itself made clear that it "in no way should be interpreted to impose sanctions on those individuals or entities". It also specified that inclusion in the report "does not constitute the determination by any agency that any of those individuals or entities meet the criteria for designation under any sanctions program", and in no way indicates that "the U.S. Government has information about the individual's involvement in malign activities".

The list below is from the unclassified section of the Section 241 (a)(1) section of the report.

Controversy regarding the "oligarchs" section 
The list of "oligarchs" submitted as part of one of the five reports delivered to Congress on 29 January 2018 included 96 names.

According to the document itself, its criterion for inclusion as an "oligarch" was simply being a Russian with a net worth of over $1 billion. The list was criticised for being indiscriminate, and including critics of Putin.

Shortly after the list was released, it was reported that the Treasury Department had simply copied it from the Forbes' 2017 "World Billionaires" list: people, including those with non-Russian citizenship on the Forbes list who had Russian heritage and a net worth of $1 billion or more, had been indiscriminately included in the CAATSA Report. In its response to a lawsuit asserting that the compilation of the list was "arbitrary, capricious, and contrary to law", the Treasury Department has confirmed that it is "not challenging" the allegation that it had "simply republished" the Forbes billionaires list.

List of names 

According to CNN, the people named on the list were:

Presidential administration 
 Anton Vayno, Head, Presidential Administration
 Alexey Gromov, First Deputy Head, Presidential Administration
 Sergey Kiriyenko, First Deputy Head, Presidential Administration
 Magomedsalam Magomedov, Deputy Head, Presidential Administration
 Vladimir Ostrovenko, Deputy Head, Presidential Administration
 Dmitriy Peskov, Deputy lead, Presidential Administration; Presidential Press Secretary
 Vladislav Kitayev, Chief of Presidential Protocol
 Andrey Belousov, Aide to the President
 Larisa Brycheva, Aide to the President
 Vladislav Surkov, Aide to the President
 Igor Levitin, Aide to the President
 Vladimir Kozhin, Aide to the President
 Yuri Ushakov, Aide to the President
 Andrey Fursenko, Aide to the President
 Nikolay Tsukanov, Aide to the President
 Konstantin Chuychenko, Aide to the President
 Evgeny Shkolov, Aide to the President
 Igor Shchegolev, Aide to the President
 Alexander Bedritsky, Adviser to the President, Special Presidential Representative on Climate Issues
 Sergey Glazyev, Adviser to the President
 Sergey Grigorov, Adviser to the President
 German Klimenko, Adviser to the President
 Anton Kobyakov, Adviser to the President
 Alexandra Levitskaya, Adviser to the President
 Vladimir Tolstoy, Adviser to the President
 Mikhail Fedotov, Adviser to the President, Chairman of the Presidential Council for Civil Society and Human Rights
 Veniamin Yakovlev, Adviser to the President
 Artur Muravyev, Presidential Envoy to the Federation Council
 Garry Minkh, Presidential Envoy to the State Duma
 Mikhail Krotov, Presidential Envoy to the Constitutional Court
 Anna Kuznetsova, Presidential Commissioner for Children’s Rights
 Boris Titov, Presidential Commissioner for Entrepreneurs’ Rights
 Mikhail Babich, Plenipotentiary Representative to the Volga Federal District
 Alexander Beglov, Plenipotentiary Representative to the Northwestern Federal District
 Oleg Belaventsev, Plenipotentiary Representative to the North Caucasus Federal District
 Aleksey Gordeyev, Plenipotentiary Representative to the Central Federal District
 Sergey Menyaylo, Plenipotentiary Representative to the Siberian Federal District
 Yuriy Trutnev, Deputy Prime Minister, Plenipotentiary Representative to the Far Eastern Federal District
 Vladimir Ustinov, Plenipotentiary Representative to the Southern Federal District
 Igor Kholmanskikh, Plenipotentiary Representative to the Urals Federal District
 Aleksandr Manzhosin, Head, Foreign Policy Directorate
 Vladimir Chemov, Head, Directorate for Interregional and Cultural Ties to Foreign Countries
 Oleg Govorun, Head, Directorate for Social and Economic Relations with the Commonwealth of Independent States, Abkhazia, and South Ossetia

Cabinet ministers 
 Dmitry Medvedev, Prime Minister
 Igor Shuvalov, First Deputy Prime Minister
 Sergey Prikhodko, Deputy Prime Minister and Head of the Government Apparatus
 Aleksandr Khloponin, Deputy Prime Minister
 Vitaliy Mutko, Deputy Prime Minister
 Arkady Dvorkovich, Deputy Prime Minister
 Olga Golodets, Deputy Prime Minister
 Dmitry Kozak, Deputy Prime Minister
 Dmitriy Rogozin, Deputy Prime Minister
 Mikhail Abyzov, Minister for Liaison with Open Government
 Aleksandr Tkachev, Minister of Agriculture
 Vladimir Puchkov, Minister of Civil Defense, Emergencies, and Natural Disasters
 Nikolay Nikiforov, Minister of Communications and Mass Media
 Mikhail Men, Minister of Construction, Housing, and Public Utilities
 Vladimir Medinsky, Minister of Culture
 Sergey Shoygu, Minister of Defense
 Maxim Oreshkin, Minister of Economic Development
 Olga Vasilyeva, Minister of Education and Science
 Aleksandr Novak, Minister of Energy
 Aleksandr Galushka, Minister of Far East Development
 Anton Siluanov, Minister of Finance
 Sergey Lavrov, Minister of Foreign Affairs
 Veronika Skvortsova, Minister of Health
 Denis Manturov, Minister of Industry and Trade
 Vladimir Kolokoltsev, Minister of Internal Affairs
 Aleksandr Konovalov, Minister of Justice
 Maxim Topilin, Minister of Labor and Social Protection
 Sergey Donskoy, Minister of Natural Resources and Ecology
 Lev Kuznetsov, Minister of North Caucasus Affairs
 Pavel Kolobkov, Minister of Sports
 Maksim Sokolov, Minister of Transportation

Other senior political leaders 
 Valentina Matviyenko, Chairwoman, Federation Council
 Sergey Naryshkin, Director, Foreign Intelligence Service (SVR)
 Vyacheslav Volodin, Chairman, State Duma
 Sergey Ivanov, Presidential Special Representative for the Environment, Ecology, and Transport
 Nikolay Patrushev, Secretary, Security Council
 Vladimir Bulavin, Head, Federal Customs Service
 Valery Gerasimov, First Deputy Minister of Defense and Chief of the General Staff
 Igor Korobov, Chief, Main Intelligence Directorate General Staff (GRU), Ministry of Defense
 Rashid Nurgaliyev, Deputy Secretary, Security Council
 Georgy Poltavchenko, Governor of Saint Petersburg
 Sergey Sobyanin, Mayor of Moscow
 Yury Chaika, Prosecutor General
 Aleksandr Bastrykin, Head, Investigative Committee
 Viktor Zolotov, Director, Federal National Guard Service
 Dmitry Kochnev, Director, Federal Protection Service
 Aleksandr Bortnikov, Director, Federal Security Service (FSB)
 Andrei Artizov, Head, Federal Archive Agency
 Yuriy Chikhanchin, Head, Financial Monitoring Federal Service
 Aleksandr Linets, Head, Presidential Main Directorate for Special Programs
 Aleksandr Kolpakov, Head, Presidential Property Management Directorate
 Valeriy Tikhonov, Head, State Courier Service
 Alexey Miller, Chief Executive Officer, Gazprom
 Igor Sechin, Chief Executive Officer, Rosneft
 German Gref, Chief Executive Officer, Sberbank
 Oleg Belozerov, General Director, Russian Railways
 Andrey Kostin, Chainnan Management Board, VTB
 Sergey Chemezov, Chief Executive Officer, Rostec
 Oleg Budargin, Chief Executive Officer, Rosseti
 Boris Kovalchuk, Chief Executive Officer, Inter RAO
 Alexey Likhachev, General Director, Rosatom
 Nikolay Tokarev, Chief Executive Officer, Transneft
 Andrey Akimov, Chief Executive Officer, Gazprombank
 Nail Maganov, General Director, Tatneft
 Vitaly Savelyev, Chief Executive Officer, Aeroflot
 Andrey Shishkin, Chief Executive Officer, ANK Bashneft
 Ymiy Slyusar, Chief Executive Officer, United Aircraft Corporation
 Nikolay Shulginov, Chief Executive Officer, RusHydro
 Sergey Gorkov, Chief Executive Officer, Vneshekonombank
 Sergey Ivanov (Jr), Chief Executive Officer, ALROSA
 Roman Dashkov, Chief Executive Officer, Sakhalin Energy

"Oligarchs"

See also 
 Presidential Administration of Russia
 Government of Russia
 State-owned enterprises of Russia
 Russian oligarchs
 List of Russian billionaires

References

External links 
 Report to Congress Pursuant to Section 241 of the Countering America's Adversaries Through Sanctions Act of 2017 Regarding Senior Foreign Political Figures and Oligarchs in the Russian Federation and Russian Parastatal Entities, hosted at the Financial Times website (archived at the Internet Archive, January 2023)

Lists of Russian people
Russia–United States relations